Kennedy McCampbell Crockett (born January 18, 1920, in Kingsville, Texas - May 3, 2001 in Kingsville, Texas ) was an American diplomat who was the United States Ambassador to Nicaragua from 1967 until April 19, 1970.

References

1920 births
2001 deaths
Ambassadors of the United States to Nicaragua
People from Kingsville, Texas